Bilsport (meaning Autosport in English) is an automobile magazine published in Karlskrona, Sweden.

History and profile
Bilsport was founded in 1962. The magazine is published by Albinsson & Sjöberg on a biweekly basis. It is based in Karlskrona. The magazine presents Bilsport Awards.

In 2014 the circulation of Bilsport was 19,600 copies.

See also
List of magazines in Sweden

References

External links
Official website

1962 establishments in Sweden
Automobile magazines
Biweekly magazines published in Sweden
Magazines established in 1962
Mass media in Karlskrona
Swedish-language magazines